The GCC U-23 Championship is an annual international football competition organised by the Gulf Cooperation Council. The first edition of the tournament was held in 2008 and was played in a round-robin group of five nations.

Records

 A round-robin tournament determined the final standings.

Performances

 Red border: Host nation.
 Blank: Did not enter.
 GS: Group Stage.

See also
 AFC
 Arabian Gulf Cup

External links
 https://web.archive.org/web/20090312023305/http://www.ua-fa.com/

 
Union of Arab Football Associations competitions
Under-23 association football
Gulf Cooperation Council